Central Institute of Plastics Engineering & Technology may refer to the following institutions in India:
Central Institute of Plastics Engineering & Technology, Bhubaneswar
Central Institute of Plastics Engineering & Technology, Hajipur
Central Institute of Plastics Engineering & Technology, Khunti
Central Institute of Plastics Engineering & Technology, Murthal
Central Institute of Plastics Engineering & Technology, Raipur